The Nocturnal Silence is the first studio album recorded by Swedish death metal band Necrophobic. It was recorded and mixed at Sunlight Studios, Stockholm, Sweden in March 1993. It was produced by Necrophobic and Tomas Skogsberg and engineered by Tomas Skogsberg and Lars Liden.

Track listing

Line-up
 Anders Strokirk: Vocals
 Tobias Sidegard: Bass
 David Parland: Guitars, Keyboard
 Joakim Sterner: Drums

References

External links
 Necrophobic official website

1993 debut albums
Necrophobic albums